Richard Charles Dillon (June 24, 1877 – January 5, 1966) was an American entrepreneur, politician and the eighth governor of New Mexico. He held the governor's office from January 1, 1927 to January 1, 1931.

Early life 
Dillon was born in St. Louis, Missouri on June 24, 1877. His early education was attained in the common schools of Missouri. In 1889, his family moved to Springer, New Mexico. He attended the public schools there. Before entering politics, he worked as a railroad laborer and a merchant.

Politics 
Dillon won election to the New Mexico State Senate in 1924. He held the position for two years. He then secured the Republican gubernatorial nomination. He was elected the governor of New Mexico by a popular vote on November 2, 1926. In 1928 he was reelected to a second term, becoming the first New Mexico governor to successfully run for reelection since the state's first governor, William C. McDonald. During his tenure, the state government was managed in an efficient business-like method and Carlsbad Caverns was declared a national park by the federal government.

Later years 
After leaving office, he retired from political life. He remained active in his business career. He eventually established the R.C. Dillon Company. He died on January 5, 1966. He was buried at Fairview Memorial Park in Albuquerque, New Mexico.

References 

 Sobel, Robert and John Raimo. Biographical Directory of the Governors of the United States, 1789-1978. Greenwood Press, 1988. 

1877 births
1966 deaths
Republican Party governors of New Mexico
Republican Party New Mexico state senators
Politicians from St. Louis
People from Springer, New Mexico